The 1992 Summer Paralympics were the ninth Paralympic Games to be held. They were held in Barcelona, Catalonia, Spain. In addition, the 1992 Paralympic Games for Persons with mental handicap were held immediately after the regular Paralympics in the Spanish capital, Madrid.

Host city selection 
Barcelona is the second-largest city in Spain and the capital of the autonomous community of Catalonia, and the hometown of then-IOC president Juan Antonio Samaranch and the famous European club, FC Barcelona that from the beginning of the candidacy provided support and financially helped the project. The city was also a host for the 1982 FIFA World Cup with two venues who were also used during the games. On 17 October 1986, Barcelona was selected to host the 1992 Summer Olympics over Amsterdam, Netherlands; Belgrade, Yugoslavia; Birmingham, United Kingdom; Brisbane, Australia; and Paris, France, during the 91st IOC Session in Lausanne, Switzerland.  With 85 out of 89 members of the IOC voting by secret ballot, Barcelona won a majority of 47 votes.  Samaranch abstained from voting.  In the same IOC meeting, Albertville, France, won the right to host the 1992 Winter Games. Paris and Brisbane would eventually be selected to host the 2024 and 2032 Summer Paralympics respectively.

Barcelona had previously bid for the 1936 Summer Olympics that were ultimately held in Berlin.

And the fact that the Spanish city was chosen to host the Olympic Games, gave hope to the Paralympic movement that the city would host the Games,days after the Summer Olympics Closing Ceremonies. On August 2, 1987, the city had its Paralympic bid  unanimously and unreservedly approved by the International Coordinating Committee (ICC).Unlike their predecessors, the Spanish bid that had an impressive and innovative factor,as the two bids were made by the same Organizing Committee that was committing to organize and hold the Olympic and Paralympic Games together, something completely different, innovative and risky at that time.

Sports 
The games consisted of 560 events spread over fifteen sports. Powerlifting and weightlifting were considered to be a single sport. Wheelchair tennis, a demonstration sport at the 1988 Summer Paralympics, was contested as an official medal sport for the first time. This was the first time that lawn bowls and snooker were dropped from the Summer Paralympic Games program.

 Archery
 Athletics
 Basketball ID
 Boccia
 Cycling
 Football 7-a-side
 Indoor Football
 Goalball
 Judo
 Lifting
 Powerlifting
 Weightlifting
 Shooting
 Swimming
 Table tennis
 Volleyball
 Wheelchair basketball
 Wheelchair fencing
 Wheelchair tennis

Venues 
In total 11 venues were used at the 1992 Summer Olympics and one new one was used at the Games in Barcelona.

Montjuic 
Estadi Olímpic de Montjuïc – opening/closing ceremonies, athletics 
Palau Sant Jordi – table tennis and volleyball
Piscines Bernat Picornell – swimming
INEFC – wheelchair fencing and judo
Estadi Pau Negre – football-7-side
Pavelló de l'Espanya Industrial – powerlifting and weightlifting
Mataró – athletics (marathon start)

Parc del Mar 
Pavelló de la Mar Bella – boccia

Vall d'Hebron 
In the north of the city, the Horta-Guinardó District, hosted three sports:

Camp Olímpic de Tir amb Arc – archery
Pavelló de la Vall d'Hebron – goalball
Tennis de la Vall d'Hebron- wheelchair tennis

Other Venues 
Badalona (Palau Municipal d'Esports de Badalona) – wheelchair basketball
Camp de Tir Olímpic de Mollet – shooting
Sant Sadurní Cycling Circuit – cycling (individual road race)

Madrid 
Palacio de Deportes de la Comunidad de Madrid – basketball, opening and closing ceremonies
Ciudad de los Poetas High School – basketball
University City of Madrid – basketball
Universidad Politécnica de Madrid – athletics
M86 Swimming Center – swimming
University of Madrid- football
Consejo Superior de Deportes- table tennis and football

Medal count

A total of 1710 medals were awarded during the 1992 games: 555 gold, 557 silver, and 594 bronze. The United States topped the medal count with more gold medals, more silver medals, and more medals overall than any other nation. Germany took the most bronze medals, with 59. The Madrid medals are counted too and added in the table
In the table below, the ranking sorts by the number of gold medals earned by a nation (in this context a nation is an entity represented by a National Paralympic Committee).

Participating delegations 
103 delegations participated at the 1992 Summer Paralympics.

South Africa returned to the Paralympics for the first time since being declared "undesirable" due to its policy of apartheid in 1980. Countries who made their first appearances in the Barcelona Games were Algeria, Burkina Faso, Chile, Chinese Taipei, Costa Rica, Cuba, Dominican Republic, Iraq, Myanmar, Namibia, Nigeria, Pakistan, Panama, Seychelles, Tanzania, Turkey, United Arab Emirates, Uruguay and Yemen.

Germany competed as a reunified country for the first time in the Summer Paralympics after the Fall of the Berlin Wall. Latvia and Lithuania competed as independent countries for the first time due to the dissolution of the Soviet Union (Estonia having competed independently at the 1992 Winter Paralympics as well), while Croatia and Slovenia did the same due to the dissolution of Yugoslavia. The remainder of Yugoslavia competed as Independent Paralympic Participants due to sanctions. Some former Soviet republics competed as a Unified Team (consisting of Armenia, Azerbaijan, Belarus, Kyrgyzstan, Moldova, Russia and Ukraine), all of whom would compete independently by the 1996 Games.

Twenty-one countries did not send a delegation to Barcelona, but sent one to Madrid; they were: Aruba, Bolivia, Côte d'Ivoire, Curaçao, El Salvador, Fiji, Ghana, Guatemala, Honduras, Jordan, Lebanon, Malta, Nicaragua, Paraguay, Philippines, Romania, Saudi Arabia, Sierra Leone, Sri Lanka, Suriname and Zimbabwe.

 
 
 
 
 
 
 
 
 
 
 
 
  Chinese Taipei (11)
 
 
 
 
 
 
 
 
 
 
 
 
 
 
 
 
 
 
 
 
 
 
 
 
 
 
 
 
 
 
 
 
 
 
 
 
 
 
 
 
 
 
 
 
 
 
 
 
 
 
 
 
 
 
 
  South Africa (10)

Mascot 

The official mascot was Petra, an armless girl designed by Javier Mariscal.

Paralympic Games for Persons with mental handicap
The first Paralympic Games for Persons with mental handicap were held immediately after the regular Paralympic games in the Spanish capital of Madrid from 15 to 22 September. Over 1,400 athletes from 74 nations participated in the competition, which was sponsored by the Association Nacional Prestura de Servicio (ANDE) and sanctioned by the International Coordinating Committee of World Sport Organizations for the Disabled and the International Association of Sport for the Mentally Handicapped. The games featured a cultural exchange group, a group of intellectually disabled men from Nagasaki who played taiko (traditional drums) during the opening and closing ceremonies and selected track events.

See also

1992 Summer Olympics
1992 Winter Paralympics
Cheating at the Paralympic Games

References 

 
Paralympic Games
Sports competitions in Barcelona
International sports competitions hosted by Catalonia
International sports competitions hosted by Spain
Paralympic Games
Paralympic Games
Paralympic Games
Multi-sport events in Spain
Summer Paralympic Games
1990s in Barcelona
1990s in Madrid
September 1992 sports events in Europe
Sports competitions in Madrid